Catacombs (also known as Curse IV: The Ultimate Sacrifice) is a 1988 American horror film directed by David Schmoeller and starring Tim Van Patten, Ian Abercrombie, and Laura Schaefer.

Plot 
In the 17th century, an order of monks in Italy capture and entomb a demon that has possessed a member of their group. 400 years later, school teacher Elizabeth Magrino (Laura Schaefer) visits the monastery in order to do some research. What she and the current monks do not realize is that the evil hiding within the catacombs has unwittingly been released.

Cast 
 Tim Van Patten as Father John Durham
 Ian Abercrombie as Brother Orsini
 Jeremy West as Brother Marinus
 Laura Schaefer as Elizabeth Magrino
 Vernon Dobtcheff as Brother Timothy
 Feodor Chaliapin Jr. as Brother Terrel
 Brett Porter as Possessed albino
 Michael Pasby as Jesus Christ
 David Schmoeller as Monk (uncredited)

Release 
The film was the last officially completed film by Empire Pictures before the company was seized by Crédit Lyonnais for failure to pay on loans. As a result, the film's release was delayed for five years. It was eventually given the new title Curse IV: The Ultimate Sacrifice by Columbia TriStar Home Video and was released direct-to-video on VHS in 1993, though it is unconnected to the 1987 film The Curse and its two sequels.

On October 29, 2013, Scream Factory released the film on DVD for the first time, along with Contamination .7, The Dungeonmaster and Cellar Dweller as part of the second volume of their Scream Factory All-Night Horror Marathon series. They later re-released the film with Cellar Dweller on a double-feature Blu-ray.

References

External links 

 
 

1988 films
1988 horror films
1980s psychological thriller films
American supernatural horror films
Empire International Pictures films
Films scored by Pino Donaggio
Films directed by David Schmoeller
Films set in religious buildings and structures
Films with screenplays by David Schmoeller
1980s English-language films
1980s American films